Damir Handanović (born 14 December 1987) is a Serbian pop-folk composer, pianist, arranger, and producer. Damir produced numerous hits for bestselling artists from former Yugoslavia, including Ceca, Saša Matić, Severina Vučković, Dragana Mirković, Nataša Bekvalac, Ana Nikolić, Maya Berović, Milan Stanković and others. He is also a music editor at RTV Pink. Handanović is the son of folk singer and composer Hašim "Paško" Handanović.

Damir Handanović is an owner of DH Music.

Production discography

2008

2009

2010

2011

References

1987 births
Living people
Serbian songwriters
Musicians from Belgrade
Serbian people of Bosniak descent